Banner Wyoming Medical Center, formerly the Memorial Hospital of Natrona County, is a non-profit hospital owned by Banner Health that is located in Casper, Natrona County, Wyoming, United States.

History

In 1986, the Memorial Hospital of Natrona County was reorganized into the Wyoming Medical Center.

In 1990, Intermountain Health Care Professional Services sold its Casper Surgical Center to Wyoming Medical Center.

Notes

References

External links
Wyoming Medical Center

Buildings and structures in Casper, Wyoming
Hospitals in Wyoming